"What Goes Around.../...Comes Around (Interlude)" is a song by American singer-songwriter Justin Timberlake from his second studio album, FutureSex/LoveSounds (2006). It was written and produced by Timberlake, Timbaland, and Danja. The song was said by Timberlake to be about betrayal and forgiveness, and was described by some music critics as a "sequel" to his 2002 single "Cry Me a River". The song received generally positive reviews from music critics.

The song was retitled "What Goes Around... Comes Around" for its December 19, 2006, release as the third single from FutureSex/LoveSounds. It became Timberlake's third consecutive number-one hit on the Billboard Hot 100. Internationally the song was also successful, reaching the top ten in countries such as the United Kingdom, Canada, New Zealand, Germany, and Australia. The song was later certified two-times platinum in Australia, gold in the United States and gold in New Zealand. The song won Best Male Pop Vocal Performance at the 50th Grammy Awards, where it also received a nomination for Record of the Year.

The Samuel Bayer-directed music video for "What Goes Around... Comes Around" was released February 7, 2007. Actress Scarlett Johansson plays Timberlake's love interest in the video. The video received the award for Best Direction at the 2007 MTV Video Music Awards and was also nominated for Video of the Year.

Production

When Timberlake began working on FutureSex/LoveSounds at Timbaland's studio in Virginia Beach, Virginia, they had no idea of what the album would be like with no plan for it or even a title. He told his collaborators to do a remake of his previous single, "Cry Me a River". Danja, a protégé of Timbaland, stated: "We had no direction at all other than 'Cry Me a River,' and not in the sense of mimicking the track, but in how big the song was. There was no direction for how he wanted the song to sound, because there was no direction for how he wanted [his album FutureSex/LoveSounds] to sound."

The song was written and produced by Justin Timberlake, Timbaland, and Nate "Danja" Hills. While in the studio, the three men were just "fooling around" and "freestyling". When Danja began playing a guitar riff, it caught Timberlake's attention. Timberlake started humming to the melody, and then the lyrics came. Timbaland, who was at his keyboards beside Danja, added drums to the melody. Danja commented that "everything was coming together at the same time". After coming up with the music, Timberlake never wrote down the lyrics and, in an hour, he was ready to record it. By the time Timberlake was in the vocal booth, the basic track was done, then Timbaland produced a prelude of the song. Timberlake sang the song in a couple of takes and went back line by line to fill up the gaps. During the recording sessions, Timbaland and Danja added everything else, including the basses and strings. Danja compared the process to scoring to a movie, thinking the song was like a horror flick.

"What Goes Around... Comes Around" was pivotal to the creation of FutureSex/LoveSounds. After finishing the production of the song, Timbaland teased Timberlake. Timberlake responded: "Let's do something we would never do. Let's go far left and just see what happens." His answer motivated the collective, and they ended up producing ten songs for the album.

Composition and interpretation

"What Goes Around.../...Comes Around" is performed in a slow manner. It is composed in the key of A Dorian (A Minor) in common time. With a gentle and midtempo beat, the tempo is pacing to 76 beats per minute. The song features a two-minute interlude titled "Comes Around", featuring the album's producer Timbaland, spanning to a seven-minute and 28-second track. Timberlake's voice ranges from B2 to C5. Musically, the song is similar to the type of music produced on Timberlake's Justified album; however, it is the only link from FutureSex/LoveSounds to Justified.

In the beginning of the song, there is a five-second harmony line of two bağlamas (one each panned far left and far right on respect octaves), a Turkish folk instrument. The beat is then changed to a more upbeat version of the same melody with more percussion. The basic ornamentation is loyal to characteristic Turkish string ornamentations. Timbaland also used the Turkish oud to mellow out the guitar riff. The chord series follows the Am-C-G-D keys. Following the instrumental, Timberlake begins the verse at thirteenth bar. The original track had a bridge, including the pre-verses, the verses and the choruses. After hearing the vocals of Timberlake, they decided to remove the bridge and follow a simple flow, because they felt its "too much" to have it and a break at the end of the song. Timbaland provides backing vocals on the song.

"What Goes Around.../...Comes Around" is about betrayal and forgiveness. Timberlake revealed that the song was written for the experience his friend went through. However, the public came up with different interpretation of the lyrics, that being a sequel to "Cry Me A River". Bill Lamb wrote that the song has a "cautionary tale in the lyrics". According to him, many fans and critics alike, after hearing the song, insisted that it is similar in meaning to "Cry Me a River", which allegedly accounts to Timberlake's relationship with former girlfriend, pop singer Britney Spears. However, Timberlake's account of the song's meaning contradicts this. Spence D. of IGN commented that the song presents "some intriguing ambiance".

Reception

Critical reception

The song received generally positive reviews from critics. Rolling Stone called the single "a soaring ballad featuring Timberlake's falsetto, with verses and choruses that pile on top of one another with dizzying effect." About.com reviewer Bill Lamb stated that the song "is one of the most gorgeous pop melodies of the year." He complimented the string-based arrangement of the song. Chris Willman of Entertainment Weekly called it "superior", along with "LoveStoned". Zach Baron of Pitchfork Media referred to it "some real can't-let-go shit that'll save you the repeat stabs on the bad night." Spence D. of IGN called it "annoying" but he complimented the use of echo vocals and swirling synths.

In later reviews, Billboards Katie Atkinson noted "with a whopping 7:28 running time, it was a very long single. But there are a lot of great pieces to this too-big puzzle." Complex staff described it as "smooth, velvety and self-assured" track, noting the singer "is not guessing that his cheating ex will be punished for her transgression—he's sure she will be." Idolator staff stated, "This track is also probably what influenced many of Taylor Swift kiss-off ballad in the years to come."

"What Goes Around.../...Comes Around" placed at number 24 on Rolling Stone's list of the 100 Best Songs of 2007. The song was nominated twice at the 50th Annual Grammy Awards, winning Best Male Pop Vocal Performance but lost to Amy Winehouse's "Rehab" for Record of the Year.

Commercial performance

"What Goes Around.../...Comes Around" was commercially successful in the United States. The single debuted at number 64 on December 23, 2006, on the Billboard Hot 100, prior to its physical release. From number eight on February 24, 2007, it propelled to number one the following week. "What Goes Around.../...Comes Around" became Timberlake's third consecutive number one hit on the Billboard Hot 100 from his FutureSex/LoveSounds album, becoming the first male artist since Usher in 2004 to have three or more consecutive number-one hits from one album. The single charted on Hot 100 for 25 weeks. "What Goes Around.../...Comes Around" was certified platinum by the Recording Industry Association of America on June 7, 2007. By September 3, 2010, the song had passed the two million sales plateau, and has sold 2,375,000 copies as of April 2013. As of 2018, the song has accumulated 3.5 million units in the US, combining sales (2.8 million copies) and equivalent streams.

In the United Kingdom, "What Goes Around.../...Comes Around" debuted at number 59 on the UK Singles Chart on January 28, 2007. The digital download sales helped propel the single to number 11 on February 25, 2007. "What Goes Around.../...Comes Around" peaked at number four on March 11, to become his sixth top five single in the United Kingdom. It stayed on the chart for 22 weeks. The single entered the top five in Austria, Belgium, Denmark, Finland, France, Germany, Ireland, Norway, Romania (where it reached number one) and Switzerland. In Australia, the single debuted and peaked at number three on the Australian ARIA singles chart on March 26, 2007, gaining the Highest Debut certification. It spent a total of 22 weeks on the chart. "What Goes Around.../...Comes Around" was certified two-times platinum by the Australian Recording Industry Association for selling over 30,000 units. The single peaked at number three in the New Zealand on April 9, 2007, and spent 16 weeks on the chart. "What Goes Around.../...Comes Around" was certified gold by the Recording Industry Association of New Zealand.

Music video

Development

The music video for the "What Goes Around... Comes Around" was produced as a short movie. The video was directed by Samuel Bayer, who had first directorial works with Nirvana's 1991 single "Smells Like Teen Spirit". The video features dialogues written by Alpha Dog writer and director Nick Cassavetes, who had previously worked with Timberlake in the film. Timberlake and Bayer enlisted American actress Scarlett Johansson after deciding on using "real" actors. The shooting went for three days between Christmas and New Year's Eve 2006 in Los Angeles. The dawn scene was shot on January 8, after the original sessions were done.

Synopsis
The video starts off with Timberlake flirting with Johansson on the burlesque-style club. She rejects with a tease at first but eventually leaves with him to go back to his place. In between cuts, they are shown in bed caressing each other. Johansson jumps into a pool outside the house, and floats below the surface as if she is drowning. Timberlake runs out and pulls her up; she laughs at Timberlake and kisses him.

In another scene, Timberlake introduces her to a drunk Shawn Hatosy at the club calling her "The One". Hatosy seems to be interested in Johansson and Timberlake asks him to "keep an eye on her for me", perhaps suspecting she has another man on the side. Timberlake returns and finds them kissing in the stairway. After punching Hatosy, he chases after Johansson, who speeds off in her 1967 Corvette Sting Ray; Timberlake follows in his Porsche Carrera GT. Johansson runs into a fiery car crash pile up and is ejected from the car as it tumbles through the air and lands several feet away twice. Timberlake notices Johansson's motionless body lying supine on the ground. He gets out and kneels over her while the camera view moves toward the sky. The end of the video references the ending of 1960 movie BUtterfield 8 in which Gloria, the main character portrayed by Elizabeth Taylor, dies in the same manner, with the scenes sharing many similar shots.

Some scenes shows Timberlake performing on the stairway with a microphone while a group of unknown girls with red paint on their eyes are seen dancing next to him while one (Johansson) is seen waving her batons with fire on them near the end of the video.

Release and reception
The music video of "What Goes Around... Comes Around" was exclusively premiered on February 9, 2007, on the iTunes Store. The music video debuted on MTV's Total Request Live at number nine on February 13, 2007. "What Goes Around..." retired on May 7 at number seven. In Canada, the music video debuted on Muchmusic's Top 30 countdown at number 22 on January 26, 2007. It peaked at number one on April 27 and stayed on the chart for seven non-consecutive weeks. The video was commercially successful, becoming the fastest selling pop promo on iTunes. It has sold 50,000 in downloads for four days. Timberlake was the first major artist to release a video on the download platform.

In September 2007, "What Goes Around... Comes Around" won an MTV Video Music Award for Best Direction. It was also nominated for Video of the Year but lost to singer Rihanna's 2007 video "Umbrella".

Live performances
Timberlake performed the song on Saturday Night Live. Timberlake performed twice at the 49th Annual Grammy Awards, once at the piano for "What Goes Around Comes Around" and later "My Love" and Bill Withers' "Ain't No Sunshine." The song is featured in the set list of FutureSex/LoveShow (2007), Legends of the Summer (2013), The 20/20 Experience World Tour (2013/14) and the Man of the Woods Tour (2018/19). Timberlake performed the song along with Shawn Mendes at the 2018 iHeartRadio Music Festival.

Cover versions
On May 23, 2007, Marilyn Manson and Tim Skold appeared on UK radio station BBC Radio 1's program Live Lounge to promote Marilyn Manson's 2007 album Eat Me, Drink Me. They performed an acoustic version of "Heart-Shaped Glasses (When the Heart Guides the Hand)", followed with an acoustic cover of "What Goes Around... Comes Around". The Manson cover does not include the interlude. On May 28, 2007, Dutch singer Esmée Denters posted a version of the song on YouTube accompanied by Justin Timberlake on piano and backing vocals. At the conclusion, he says, "She sings my song better than me." Timberlake later produced Denters' debut album, Outta Here. French singer Myriam Abel, the winner of Nouvelle Star 3, also recorded a non-commercial cover of "What Goes Around.../...Comes Around" with a Raï influence, accessible through her official MySpace page. An a cappella rendition was recorded by Overboard for their 2007 album, Stranded. American post hardcore band Alesana recorded a cover for the Punk Goes... compilation series, Punk Goes Pop 2, released March 10, 2009. Taylor Swift performed a mashup of "You're Not Sorry" and "What Goes Around... Comes Around" during her Fearless Tour (2009–10). Benny Davis, of the Australian musical comedy act The Axis of Awesome, also heavily sampled the song on his track "Another Four Chords" on The Human Jukebox EP, released in 2013.

Track listings

 German CD single
 "What Goes Around... Comes Around" (Radio Edit) – 5:13
 "What Goes Around... Comes Around" (Sebastien Leger Remix – Radio Edit) – 4:14

 Australian and German CD maxi single
 "What Goes Around... Comes Around" (Radio Edit) – 5:13
 "Boutique in Heaven" – 4:11
 "What Goes Around... Comes Around" (Mysto & Pizzi Mix) – 7:43
 "What Goes Around... Comes Around" (Junkie XL Small Room Mix) – 4:54

 UK CD maxi single
 "What Goes Around... Comes Around" (Radio Edit) – 5:13
 "Boutique in Heaven" – 4:13
 "What Goes Around... Comes Around" (Wookie Mix) [Radio Edit] – 3:55
 "What Goes Around... Comes Around" (Sebastien Leger Mix) [Radio Edit] – 4:14
 "What Goes Around... Comes Around" (Junkie XL Small Room Mix) – 4:54

 Digital download (radio edit)
 "What Goes Around... Comes Around" (Radio Edit) – 5:14

 Digital download (The Remixes)
 "What Goes Around... Comes Around" (Paul van Dyk Club Mix) – 8:49
 "What Goes Around... Comes Around" (Junkie XL Big Room Extended Mix) – 9:48
 "What Goes Around... Comes Around" (Quentin Harris Mix) – 10:30
 "What Goes Around... Comes Around" (Mysto & Pizzi Main Mix) – 7:44
 "What Goes Around... Comes Around" (Junkie XL Small Room Mix) – 4:56

 UK 12-inch vinyl
 "What Goes Around... Comes Around" (Wookie Mix)
 "Boutique in Heaven" (UK Bonus Non LP Cut)
 "What Goes Around... Comes Around" (Sebastien Leger Mix)
 "What Goes Around... Comes Around" (Radio Edit)

Credits and personnel
Credits are adapted from the FutureSex/LoveSounds booklet.

 Davis Barnett – viola
 Jeff Chestek – strings recorder
 Jenny D'Lorenzo – cello
 Jimmy Douglass – mixer, recorder
 Larry Gold – conductor, strings arranger
 Nathaniel Hills – drums, keys, producer, writer
 Gloria Justin – violin

 Emma Kummrow – violin
 Timothy Mosley – drums, Roland TR-808 claps, keys, mixer, producer, recorder, writer
 Charles Parker, Jr – violin
 John Stahl – strings recorder assistant
 Igor Szwec – violin
 Justin Timberlake – producer, writer

Charts

Weekly charts

Year-end charts

Certifications

!scope="col" colspan="3"| Mastertone/Ringtone
|-

Release history

See also
 List of Romanian Top 100 number ones of the 2000s

References

External links
 

2000s ballads
2005 songs
2006 singles
2007 singles
Billboard Hot 100 number-one singles
Contemporary R&B ballads
European Hot 100 Singles number-one singles
Grammy Award for Best Male Pop Vocal Performance
Jive Records singles
Justin Timberlake songs
MTV Video Music Award for Best Direction
Music videos directed by Samuel Bayer
Number-one singles in Romania
Number-one singles in Turkey
Pop ballads
Song recordings produced by Danja (record producer)
Song recordings produced by Justin Timberlake
Song recordings produced by Timbaland
Songs written by Danja (record producer)
Songs written by Justin Timberlake
Songs written by Timbaland